"Rock 'n' Roll Is King" is a song written and performed by Electric Light Orchestra (ELO) released as a single from the 1983 album Secret Messages. With this song the band returned to their rock roots. It features a violin solo by Mik Kaminski.

The song went through many changes during recording and at one point was going to be called "Motor Factory" with a completely different set of lyrics. The single proved to be ELO's last UK top twenty hit single, and reached No. 19 in the US in August 1983.

In an interview in the King of the Universe fanzine, Dave Morgan, who was with ELO at the time, described his involvement with the recording as such:

Chart history

Weekly charts

Year-end charts

References

1983 singles
1983 songs
Electric Light Orchestra songs
British rock-and-roll songs
Song recordings produced by Jeff Lynne
Songs written by Jeff Lynne
Songs about rock music
Jet Records singles